Nicrophorus encaustus is a burying beetle described by Les Hydrethus Fairmaire in 1896.

References

Silphidae
Beetles of North America
Beetles described in 1896